The Lockwood Drifter is a family of high wing, single engine, pusher configuration, open cockpit, one and two-seat kit aircraft that was first introduced in the 1980s by Maxair and remains in production today by Lockwood Aircraft of Sebring, Florida.

Development
The Drifter was first marketed by Maxair in the 1980s as both a single seat and two seats-in-tandem kitplane.

After Maxair went out of business, the design was picked up in 1997 by Lockwood Aircraft who produced kits for a number of single and two-seat versions, mostly differing by installed engine. The Lockwood versions are all wire-braced using a kingpost to support the ground wires. Over 1000 wire-braced Drifters have been completed and flown.

Lockwood estimates that a builder will take 300 hours to complete a Super Drifter from the currently supplied kit.

Australian developments
From the 1983, Austflight ULA originally based at Ballina, New South Wales began licence production of the Drifter. In 1986, the company moved to purpose built facilities at Boonah, Queensland where they built fully assembled Drifter variants certified by Civil Aviation Safety Authority for the Australian market with powerplants including Rotax 503 to Rotax 582 and Rotax 912 engines. Further improvements led to the Strut Braced (SB) version built to CAO 101.55 class certification in December 1993.  The Drifter SB was sold in the US in the 1990s by Tiger Aviation of Trenton, South Carolina. Over 500 strut braced Drifters were completed and flown.

In late 1995 a joint venture called the Shanghai Fenton Light Aircraft Company (SFLAC) was established with the Shanghai Aircraft Manufacturing Factory for the manufacture of Australian versions in China. Austflight suffered financial losses due to the costs associated with certification and the joint venture agreement. In May 2002 Austflight sold the last of its assets and transferred the Drifter Type Certificate to Noosa Air Pty Ltd.  Drifter Aircraft Pty Ltd of Dalby, Queensland was incorporated in 2006 to manufacture and market the Drifter and on the 1st of June 2006 was issued with a production certificate by CASA.

Design

All models of the Drifter are built around an aluminum tube keel, with aluminum tubing making up the keel-to-wing structure. There is no enclosed fuselage; the seats are open to the air. The conventional landing gear includes a steerable tailwheel. Most Drifter kits were delivered with a small fibreglass nose fairing.

The wing is built from aluminum tubing and covered with  pre-sewn Dacron sailcloth envelopes. Controls are conventional three-axis, with dual controls and center-mounted control sticks. Lockwood offers optional flaps as part of its STOL kit. The single seat Drifter and XP503 are both stressed for +6/-3g.

With its large wing area the Drifter adapted well to floats and was fitted with several types, including Full Lotus floats. The glide ratio is 9:1.

Operational history
Drifters have been widely used in a number of roles, including recreational flying, agricultural spraying, aerial photography, flight training and banner towing, during which many Drifters have accumulated high numbers of flying hours, leading one reviewer to note: "its long track record has revealed no weakness in the Drifter". A number of Lockwood XP503s have been reported to have exceeded 3000 hours and one Drifter used for banner towing exceeded 10,000 flight hours.

In reviewing the Drifter, Andre Cliche said:

Bayerl et al. describe the aircraft as "light in weight, but aerodynamically handicapped", due to its high-drag cable bracing.

Variants
Maxair Drifter
Single seat, wire braced, equipped with  Rotax 277 engine,  gross weight.
Maxair Drifter DR447
Single seat, wire braced, equipped with  Rotax 447 engine,  gross weight. Intended for float use.
Maxair Drifter XP503
Two seats in tandem, wire braced, equipped with  Rotax 503 engine,  gross weight.
Lockwood Drifter DR447
Single seat, wire braced, equipped with  Rotax 447 engine,  gross weight.
Lockwood Drifter XP503
Two seats in tandem, wire braced, equipped with  Rotax 503 engine,  gross weight.
Lockwood Drifter MU582
Two seats in tandem, wire braced, equipped with  Rotax 582 engine,  gross weight. Intended for float and agricultural use.
Lockwood Super Drifter
Two seats in tandem, wire braced, equipped with  Rotax 912 engine,  gross weight. Intended for amphibious float use.
Tiger Aviation Drifter SB
Two seats in tandem, strut braced, equipped with the  Rotax 582 engine or optionally the  Jabiru 2200 engine,  gross weight. 500 reported as flying.

Specifications (Super Drifter)

See also

References

External links

Official website archive on Archive.org
Photo of a wire braced Maxair Drifter

1980s United States ultralight aircraft
Single-engined pusher aircraft
Parasol-wing aircraft